Stanningley railway station, also called Stanningley for Farsley, is a closed railway station in Stanningley, Pudsey, West Yorkshire, England, located about  west of Leeds station. It also served Farsley and Pudsey, the latter namely until the Pudsey Loop was built.

It was opened on 1 August 1854 as a station on the Leeds, Bradford and Halifax Junction Railway, later part of the GNR, from Leeds Central station to Bradford Adolphus Street. On 1 April 1878 a branch from Stanningley to Pudsey Greenside was opened which eventually evolved into the Pudsey loop line railway. Having been renamed into Stanningley for Farsley, the station name reverted to Stanningley in 1961. Stanningley railway station closed on 1 January 1968, while the line itself has remained open, with trains of the Calder Valley Line passing the site of the former station.

The station had a sizeable goods yard. The goods shed has survived almost intact and is used by a builders’ merchant, while the station building is used as business premises. In its function as a railway station for Farsley, it has been replaced by New Pudsey railway station which is situated about 1 mile further west.

References

External links 
 
 

Disused railway stations in Leeds
Former Great Northern Railway stations
Railway stations in Great Britain opened in 1854
Railway stations in Great Britain closed in 1968
Pudsey